Paolo Meneguzzi (born 6 December 1976, as Pablo Meneguzzo) is a Swiss Italian singer. He is the son of Loredana Pacchiani and Gomez Meneguzzo.

Biography
In 1996, while the name Paolo Meneguzzi was still unknown in Italy, Paolo won the Viña del Mar International Song Festival held in Chile with the song "Aria, Ariò". The success of the song prompted the release of his debut album "Por Amor" on 27 March 1997. Paolo continued to build his career with the release of another album, self-titled, which contained the anticipated single, "Si enamorarse".

Paolo Meneguzzi's Italian debut occurred with his participation in the Young Artists section at the Sanremo Music Festival in 2001. His song "Ed io non ci sto più" earned him seventh place.

That same year, the album Un sogno nelle mani was released.

He released a new single in 2002, "In nome dell'amore". In 2003, he released the single "Verofalso", and the album Lei è, released in October that year, went gold (with 50,000 copies sold), and then double platinum (200,000 copies sold).

In 2004, he released the single "Guardami negli occhi (prego)", which reached fourth place with 127,346 votes at Sanremo, and the new edition of "Lei è" was released, containing an additional song, Baciami, and the remixes of Lei è and Verofalso, in addition to the song from Sanremo.

In June 2004, the Lei è tour from Bellinzona (CH) began, his first tour, that travelled throughout Italy and Switzerland and was more successful among young people than among small children.

In 2005, he once again participated in the Festival di Sanremo with the song Non capiva che l'amavo. In the same week, the album Favola is released and after two weeks as a single, went platinum, selling over 200,000 copies.

After having spent the summer of 2005 between Italy and Switzerland with the Favola tour, Paolo dedicated himself to the creation of a new album. After two years of silence, he announced his participation in the Festival di Sanremo and of the release (on 9 March) of the album Musica.

He participated in the Festival di Sanremo 2007, with the song Musica, placing sixth, having gained much success and above all, the approval of Pippo Baudo, who defined him as "The Exemplar of the Festival di Sanremo".

Musica was released on 9 March 2007, Paolo's fourth Italian album, following the release of the namesake single that remains the most sold in Italy.

On 21 April he began the Musica Tour, still in Switzerland, but this time departing from Biasca. On 2 November, the fan club gathering with the artist took place in the studios of Radio Italia in Cologno Monzese.

On 26 November 2007, it was announced that Paolo would be representing his home country Switzerland in the Eurovision Song Contest 2008 in Belgrade, Serbia, competing with the pop ballad "Era stupendo". He took part in the second semi-final of the contest on Thursday 22 May 2008, competing against 18 other countries, all competing for one of 10 spots in the final on Saturday 24. However, he failed to qualify to the final.

Paolo participated in the Sanremo Music Festival 2008, performing the song "Grande" and placing sixth. The song was included in his fifth album, titled Corro via. Released on 14 March 2008, it also features the single "Era stupendo".

Paolo Meneguzzi is the founder of "Progettoamore" (Love Project). Progettoamore is a charity founded in 2009, to support and help children and adolescents.

Discography

Italian and Swiss markets

International studio albums
 1997: Por Amor
 1998: Paolo
 1999: Emociones
 2001: Un sueño entre las manos
 2006: Ella Es
 2007: Musica
 2008: Corro Via
 2010: Miami
 2011: Best Of: Sei Amore

Spanish / Latin American market albums
 1996: Por amor
 1997: Paolo
 1997: Solo para ti
 1999: Emociones
 2001: Un sueño entre las manos
 2005: Ella es
 2007: Música [Spanish Edition]
 2012: Mi misión

French market albums
 2004: Elle est

Live / DVDs

Singles

Participation in Sanremo Music Festival
 2001: "Ed io non ci sto più" (R. Zappy) – 7th place
 2004: "Guardami negli occhi" (P. Meneguzzi, Rosario Di Bella, L. Mattoni, D. Melotti) – 4th place
 2005: "Non capiva che l'amavo" (P. Meneguzzi, Rosario Di Bella, D. Melotti) – non-finalist
 2007: "Musica" (P. Meneguzzi, D. Melotti, Rosario Di Bella) – 6th place
 2008: "Grande" (Gatto Panceri) – 6th place

Other releases (Italian)
 1996: "Arià Ariò"
 1996: "Sei la fine del mondo"
 2001: "Mi sei mancata"
 2001: "Quel ti amo maledetto"
 2002: "Il nome dell'amore" (solo)
 2003: "Lei è"
 2004: "Una regola d'amore"
 2005: "Lui e Lei"
 2007: "Musica" (feat. Nate James)
 2007: "Ti amo ti odio"
 2007: "Ho bisogno d'amore"
 2008: "Tú eres música" ("Musica" Spanish version)
 2010: "Imprevedibile"
 2010: "Se per te"
 2011: "Sei amore"
 2011: "Mi missión"Releases (French) 2004: "Au nom de l'amour" (with Ophélie Cassy) (French version of "Il nome dell'amore")
 2004: "Prends mon corps et ma vie"Releases (Spanish)'''
 1996: "Aria' ario'"
 1996: "La primera vez"
 1996: "Loco loco"
 1996: "Eres el fin del mundo"
 1996: "Golpes bajos"
 1997: "Si enamorarse"
 1998: "Por una como tú"
 1998: "Aire de fiesta"
 1999: "Mi libre canción"
 1999: "Sabor de sal"
 2001: "Y yo no aguanto más"
 2001: "Un condenado te amo"
 2001: "Tú me faltabas"
 2005: "Ella es"
 2005: "Mírame a los ojos"
 2005: "Bésame"
 2008: "Tú eres música"
 2009: "Te amo te odio"
 2012: "Mi misión"
 2016: "Dedicada a ti"
 2016: "Verano"

References

External links 

 
 

1976 births
Italian-language singers of Switzerland
Spanish-language singers
French-language singers of Switzerland
Eurovision Song Contest entrants for Switzerland
Eurovision Song Contest entrants of 2008
Living people
People from Ticino
People from Mendrisio
21st-century Swiss  male singers